The 2018 Maryland House of Delegates elections were held on November 6, 2018, as part of the biennial United States elections. All 141 of Maryland's state delegates were up for reelection.

Prior to the election, there was little doubt that Democrats would hold their majority in the chamber. Maryland's House of Delegates has had a Democratic majority since the elections of 1920, and it remains a solidly Democratic in elections at both the national and state level. Still, there was some discussion about whether or not Republicans would be able to make inroads in the chamber, especially considering that popular incumbent Governor Larry Hogan was running for reelection at the top of the ticket simultaneously. These hopes were not met; though Hogan won his race by double digits, there was very little down-ballot appetite for Republicans, including in the House of Delegates.

Democrats picked off eight seats from Republicans, while Republicans flipped one seat from Democrats. The result was a net gain of seven seats for the Democrats, which came from across the state. Six counties had seats flip to the Democrats, including two in Baltimore County. The one seat Republicans did pick up was in a conservative Anne Arundel County district where a retiring incumbent had switched parties from Republican to Democratic the month before the election.

Overall, the results were a seen as a disappointment for Republicans, who had hoped Hogan's success would carry more Republicans to Annapolis. After the elections, Democrats held 99 seats to the Republicans' 42, meaning Democrats were in possession of more than 70% of seats in the chamber—enough to capture a two-thirds supermajority capable of overriding gubernatorial vetoes. Many factors contributed to the Democrats' gains, but President Donald Trump's unpopularity in the Old Line State, as well as Maryland's large and growing minority population and its heavily suburban nature, were among the most important.

Election results
All election results are from the Maryland Board of Elections.

District 1A

District 1B

District 1C

District 2A

District 2B

District 3A

District 3B

District 4

District 5

District 6

District 7

District 8

District 9A

District 9B

District 10

District 11

District 12

District 13

District 14

District 15

District 16

District 17

District 18

District 19

District 20

District 21

District 22

District 23A

District 23B

District 24

District 25

District 26

District 27A

District 27B

District 27C

District 28

District 29A

District 29B

District 29C

District 30A

District 30B

District 31A

District 31B

District 32

District 33

District 34A

District 34B

District 35A

District 35B

District 36

District 37A

District 37B

District 38A

District 38B

District 38C

District 39

District 40

District 41

District 42A

District 42B

District 43

District 44A

District 44B

District 45

District 46

District 47A

District 47B

References

House of Delegates
Maryland House of Delegates
Maryland House of Delegates elections